Gabriello Chiabrera (18 June 155214 October 1638) was an Italian poet, sometimes called the Italian Pindar. His "new metres and a Hellenic style enlarged the range of lyric forms available to later Italian poets."

Biography
Chiabrera was of patrician descent and born at Savona, a little town in the domain of the Genoese republic, 28 years after the birth of Pierre de Ronsard, with whom he has more in common than with the great Greek whose echo he sought to make himself. As he states in a pleasant fragment of autobiography prefixed to his works, where like Julius Caesar he speaks of himself in the third person, he was a posthumous child; he went to Rome at the age of nine, under the care of his uncle Giovanni. There he read with a private tutor, suffered severely from two fevers in succession, and was sent at last, for the sake of society, to the Jesuit College, where he remained till his 20th year, studying philosophy, as he says, "rather for occupation than for learning's sake".

Losing his uncle about this time, Chiabrera returned to Savona, "again to see his own and be seen by them." A little while later he returned to Rome and entered the household of a cardinal, where he remained for several years, frequenting the society of Paulus Manutius and of Sperone Speroni, the dramatist and critic of Tasso, and attending the lectures and hearing the conversation of Muretus. His revenge of an insult offered him obliged him to betake himself once more to Savona, where, to amuse himself, he read poetry, and particularly Greek.

Poets of his choice were Pindar and Anacreon. These he studied until it became his ambition to reproduce in his own tongue their rhythms and structures and to enrich his country with a new form of verse, and "like his country-man, Columbus, to find a new world or drown." His reputation was made at once; but he seldom quit Savona, though often invited to do so, saving for journeys of pleasure, in which he greatly delighted, and for occasional visits to the courts of princes where he was often summoned for his verse's sake and in his capacity as a dramatist. At the age of 50 he took a wife, Lelia Pavese, by whom he had no children. After a simple, blameless life, in which he produced a vast quantity of verse — epic, tragic, pastoral, lyrical and satirical — he died in Savona on 14 October 1638. An elegant Latin epitaph was written for him by Pope Urban VIII, but his tombstone bears two quaint Italian hexameters of his own, warning the gazer from the poet's example not to prefer Parnassus to Calvary.

Works

A maker of odes in their elaborate pomp of strophe and antistrophe, a master of new, complex rhythms, a coiner of ambitious words and composite epithets, an employer of audacious transpositions and inversions, and the inventor of a new system of poetic diction, Chiabrera was compared with Ronsard. Both were destined to suffer eclipse as great and sudden as their glory. Ronsard was succeeded by Malherbe and by French literature, properly so-called; Chiabrera was the last of the great Italians, after whom literature languished till a second renaissance under Manzoni. Chiabrera, however, was a man of merit, not just an innovator. Setting aside his epics and dramas (one of the latter was honoured with a translation by Nicolas Chrétien, a sort of scenic du Bartas), much of his work remains readable and pleasant. His grand Pindarics are dull, but some of his Canzonette, like the anacreontics of Ronsard, are elegant and graceful. His autobiographical sketch is also interesting. The simple poet, with his adoration of Greek (when a thing pleased him greatly he was wont to talk of it as "Greek Verse"), delight in journeys and sightseeing, dislike of literary talk save with intimates and equals, vanities and vengeances, pride in remembered favours bestowed on him by popes and princes, infinita maraviglia over Virgil's versification and metaphor, fondness for masculine rhymes and blank verse, and quiet Christianity: all this may deserve more study than is likely to be spent on that "new world" of art which it was his glory to fancy his own, by discovery and by conquest.

Giambattista Marino was a contemporary of Chiabrera whose verses provide a comparison.

References

External links 
 
 
 
 
 
 

1552 births
1638 deaths
Italian poets
Italian male poets
People from Savona
17th-century Italian dramatists and playwrights
Italian-language poets
17th-century Italian poets
Baroque writers